Judy Hermans is a South African politician from the Western Cape who has been serving as a Member of the National Assembly since June 2019. Hermans is a member of the African National Congress.

Parliamentary career
Hermans was given the 113th position on the national-to-national list of the African National Congress for the 2019 general election. She was not elected.

Hermans entered the National Assembly on 10 June 2019 as a replacement for former cabinet minister Tokozile Xasa, who had resigned.

Committee assignment
Portfolio Committee On Trade and Industry
Committee for Section 194 Enquiry

References

External links
Ms. Judy Hermans – Xanopia
Hermans, Judy – ANC Parliament
Ms Judy Hermans – Parliament of South Africa

Living people
Year of birth missing (living people)
People from the Western Cape
African National Congress politicians
Members of the National Assembly of South Africa
Women members of the National Assembly of South Africa